Ziyun Miao and Buyei Autonomous County is a county in the southwest of Guizhou province, China. It is under the administration of the prefecture-level city of Anshun.

Climate

References

County-level divisions of Guizhou
Bouyei autonomous counties
Miao autonomous counties